Since its introduction to motorsport in the early 1970s, Toyota has been involved in a number of motorsport activities, most notably in Formula One, NASCAR, IndyCar, sports car racing, various off road rallies and the WRC. Currently, Toyota participates in the Toyota Racing Series, Super Formula, Formula Three, Formula Drift, NHRA, USAC, Super GT, NASCAR, the WRC and the WEC.

Rallying

Toyota's presence in motorsport can be traced back to the latter part of 1972, when Swedish driver, Ove Andersson, drove for Toyota during the RAC Rally of Great Britain. During the winter of 1972, Andersson formed Andersson Motorsport in his native country and began running a rallying program for Toyota. The move turned out to be an impractical one and three years after establishing his team, Andersson moved its base from Sweden to Brussels in Belgium. The team was renamed to Toyota Team Europe.

Toyota's first win in motorsport came at the 1975 1000 Lakes Rally in Finland, when Hannu Mikkola and his co-driver Atso Aho won the event in a Toyota Corolla. Three years later, the team moved to a new base in Cologne, in western Germany. It was not until the 1980s when Toyota began to gain continuous World Rally Championship success, especially in the long-distance African rallies, where Björn Waldegård and Juha Kankkunen were usually top of the time sheets. The team then set-up its all-purpose motorsport facility in Cologne three years later, which is still used today.

In the 1990 season, Carlos Sainz won the drivers' title, giving Toyota its first-ever world championship title in a four-wheel drive Toyota Celica, and repeated the feat two years later. In 1993, Toyota bought the team from Andersson and named it Toyota Motorsport GmbH. In the same year, Kankkunen won the world title and Toyota won the manufacturers' championship, becoming the first Japanese manufacturer to do so. This success was repeated a year later, but this time it was Frenchman Didier Auriol who clinched the drivers' world championship.

In 1995, Toyota were caught using illegal turbo restrictors at the Rally Catalunya and were given a 12-month ban by the FIA. FIA president Max Mosley called the illegal turbo restrictor "the most sophisticated device I've ever seen in 30 years of motor sports." Toyota and their drivers, Kankkunen, Auriol and Armin Schwarz, were also stripped of all points in the championships. Kankkunen had been in contention for the drivers' world title. Mosley stated that "there is no suggestion the drivers were aware of what was going on."

Toyota returned to the WRC with a World Rally Car based on the Toyota Corolla. The Corolla WRC debuted at the 1997 Rally Finland, with Auriol finishing in eighth place and Marcus Grönholm retiring. In the 1998 season, Sainz came within two points of the world title, after his Corolla WRC suffered an engine failure only 500 metres from the finish of the final stage of the final rally in Great Britain. Toyota were within six points of the manufacturers' championship.

Toyota decided to quit running in the WRC at the end of the 1999 season, quoting that "all that can be achieved has been achieved." The team managed to secure the manufacturers' title in their last season, four points ahead of their nearest rival Subaru, while Auriol placed third in the drivers' championship, coming within ten points of the drivers' title, and Sainz fifth.

In March 2007, Toyota debuted its Super 2000 -category Corolla rally car, which will compete in the Australian Rally Championship.

After seventeen years of absence, Toyota entered the 2017 World Rally Championship with Toyota Gazoo Racing WRT and the Toyota Yaris WRC World Rally Car. The team is based in Finland and is run by former World Rally Champion Tommi Mäkinen. Toyota won its fourth Manufacturers title in 2018, while Ott Tänak and Sébastien Ogier won a drivers crown with the Yaris the following years. , Toyota has six WRC Manufacturers Titles to date, promoting the brand as the third most successful Manufacturer to grace the championship.

CART IndyCar World Series/IRL IndyCar Series
Toyota raced in the CART IndyCar World Series from 1996 to 2002. Its early years in the series were marked by struggles. Toyota-powered cars, campaigned by the All American Racers and PPI Motorsports teams, languished at the back of the grid, slow and unreliable. Toyota didn't even lead a lap until Alex Barron led 12 laps at the Vancouver street circuit in September 1998.

Toyota started seeing its fortunes improve in 1999 as Scott Pruett took pole position at the final race of the season at the California Speedway. The next year, Juan Pablo Montoya gave Toyota its first-ever CART win at the Milwaukee Mile, the first of 5 races won by Toyota-powered cars that year. Toyota-powered cars won six races in 2001. In 2002, Toyota's final year in the championship, it turned things around completely from its bleak debut. Toyota won the Manufacturer's championship, 10 races, and Cristiano da Matta rode Toyota power to the driver's championship, with Bruno Junqueira, also Toyota-powered car, finished second.

Toyota moved to the IRL IndyCar Series in 2003 and provided direct factory support to former CART teams Team Penske and Target Chip Ganassi Racing by receiving free engines as well as other teams. They were one of the top engines in their first year, winning the Indianapolis 500 with Gil de Ferran and the championship with Scott Dixon. However, 2004 and 2005 were not so kind and wins were few and far between. Following the 2005 IndyCar Series, Team Penske and Target Chip Ganassi Racing announced they would switch to Honda engines, leaving Toyota with no championship contenders. As a result of this and their intent to re-allocate resources for NASCAR, Toyota announced they would leave the IndyCar Series prematurely during the off-season.

Toyota still remained in the IndyCar Series as only a title sponsor for the Long Beach Grand Prix from 2009 until 2018 until it was replaced by Acura as official title sponsor of Long Beach Grand Prix from 2019 onwards.

Le Mans and the World Endurance Championship

Toyota's 24 Hours of Le Mans efforts date back to the 1980s with Dome prepared Group C cars. Factory supported Toyota Team Tom's competed in World Sportscar Championship and Le Mans until 1994, with varying results. Toyota achieved 2nd place in the 1992 24 Hours of Le Mans.

Toyota started recruiting staff for their Le Mans efforts in 1997, with an aim to start a Formula One team. Toyota's efforts for a Le Mans car was the Toyota GT-One. Driver line-up included ex-Formula One drivers Martin Brundle, Thierry Boutsen and Ukyo Katayama. The 3.6-litre twin-turbo GT-Ones were beaten in 1998, but in 1999 they were the quickest cars in the field. However, they failed to achieve a victory after a tire failure late in the race. The GT-One held the lap record for the Circuit de la Sarthe up until 2006, however.

Toyota returned to the Le Mans 24 Hours and the FIA World Endurance Championship in 2012 with a petrol-electric hybrid car, the Toyota TS030 Hybrid.

In the 2014 FIA World Endurance Championship Toyota won the Manufacturers championship and Toyota team drivers Anthony Davidson and Sébastien Buemi won the Drivers championship in the Toyota TS040 Hybrid.

In 2016 they led the Le Mans 24 Hours for 23 hours and 55 minutes, until the car inexplicably stopped due to a mechanical failure, and the then-second placed Porsche overtook them for the win. The other Toyota went on to finish second. The initial leading Toyota eventually completed the final lap in 11 minutes and 55 seconds, but was not classified, as it could not finish the final lap in 6 minutes as required by race regulation 10.5.

After the 2017 season, both Audi and Porsche had left the series, leaving Toyota as the only manufacturer entry and the only hybrid entry in the series, including Le Mans.

In 2018, Toyota broke its curse at Le Mans when the No. 8 Toyota TS050 Hybrid won the race, becoming the second Japanese manufacturer after Mazda to win outright at the Circuit de La Sarthe. Toyota also won the following three races at Le Mans.

In 2022  Toyota secured a fifth consecutive win in the Le Mans 24 Hours.

NASCAR
Toyota races the Toyota Camry in NASCAR's NASCAR Cup Series, the Toyota Supra in the Xfinity Series, and the Toyota Tundra in the Camping World Truck Series.

Goody's Dash Series

In 1982, Davey Allison drove a Toyota Celica in the then-called NASCAR International Sedan Series, where he would be taken out of the race with mechanical issues. Toyota made its first factory-supported move into the NASCAR ranks with the introduction of its V6-Celica Goody's Dash program in 2000. Robert Huffman helped make Toyota a legitimate contender for the series title by its second season while placing second in the championship in both 2001 and 2002. In 2003, Huffman broke through to become Toyota's first-ever NASCAR champion to win the series title.

Truck Series

As of the 2021 season, Clay Greenfield Motorsports, Halmar Friesen Racing, Hattori Racing Enterprises, Kyle Busch Motorsports, G2G Motorsports and ThorSport Racing currently run the Tundra in the NASCAR Camping World Truck Series. Travis Kvapil gave Toyota its first win in a NASCAR national series, in what was then the NASCAR Craftsman Truck Series, in the 2004 Line-X 200 at Michigan International Speedway in his Tundra sponsored by Line-X and owned by Bang! Racing.

Todd Bodine became the first driver to give Toyota a NASCAR championship by winning the Truck Series title in 2006. Other driver's championships won by Toyota include Johnny Benson Jr. in 2008, Bodine in 2010, Matt Crafton in 2013 and 2014, Erik Jones in 2015 Christopher Bell in 2017, Brett Moffitt in 2018 and Ben Rhodes in 2021. Several high-profile drivers such as Kimi Räikkönen and Nelson Piquet Jr. had tested or driven Toyota trucks within the series.

Xfinity Series
As of the 2021 season, Joe Gibbs Racing, MBM Motorsports, and Sam Hunt Racing run Supras in the NASCAR Xfinity Series. Jason Leffler gave Toyota its first win in the series (then known as the Busch Series) in the Kroger 200 at O'Reilly Raceway Park on July 28, 2007, in his Camry owned by Braun Racing. Since 2019, Toyota has run the Supra in the series.

Kyle Busch won the series' driver's championship in 2009, while Daniel Suárez did so in 2016. Daniel Hemric won the title in 2021.

Cup Series

As of the 2021 season, 23XI Racing, Gaunt Brothers Racing, Joe Gibbs Racing, and MBM Motorsports run Toyota Camrys in the NASCAR Cup Series.

After success in the Craftsman Truck Series, Toyota moved to the then Busch Series and Nextel Cup Series with the Toyota Camry for 2007. Two relatively new teams, Michael Waltrip Racing and Red Bull Racing Team, along with long-time Cup team Bill Davis Racing spearheaded the initial Toyota Cup program. Toyota struggled in its first season in the series, harnessing only two poles in 36 races, and posting only one five top-5 and ten top-10 finishes across 7 Toyota teams. After the 2007 season, Toyota added 3-time champion Joe Gibbs Racing and affiliate Hall of Fame Racing to the Camry lineup. BAM Racing also joined Toyota Motorsports early in the 2008 season.

Kyle Busch gave Toyota its first Cup win in the Kobalt Tools 500 at Atlanta Motor Speedway on March 9, 2008; he led a race-high 173 laps in his Snickers-sponsored Camry, owned by Joe Gibbs Racing. At the end of the 2008 season, Toyota had 10 victories and Denny Hamlin and Busch finished 8th and 10th respectively in the 2008 Chase for the Sprint Cup. In 2009, Toyota would continue its successful run with a further 10 victories, 4 each for star drivers Hamlin and Busch along with surprise wins from MWR's David Reutimann and Red Bull's Brian Vickers. By this time Toyota had established itself as a regular winner in NASCAR's top series, but a championship still eluded them. Coming off back to back 10 win seasons Toyota was poised to challenge four-time defending series champion Jimmie Johnson and the Chevrolet juggernaut for the crown. After a torrid start by Johnson with wins in three of the first five races, Hamlin emerged as a real threat to the dominant Hendrick Motorsports team. Hamlin would win a series-high eight races for Toyota during the 2010 campaign and hold the points lead going into the final race of the season before an untimely incident would cost him the title. 2011 would prove to be a slightly down year for Toyota as flagship team JGR struggled to find the speed they had shown the year before.

The 2012 campaign was one of change for Toyota as they merged engine programs with Joe Gibbs Racing. To this point JGR had been building their Toyota motors in-house under Mark Cronquist while Toyota's TRD facility in California supplied Michael Waltrip's outfit. The engine merger provided for more collaboration and shared resources among the top Toyota teams with all engines being produced by TRD in California. As a result, MWR emerged as a more consistent performer, winning three races with new addition Clint Bowyer and showing much better pace with all their cars. This boost in performance, coupled with a further five wins from JGR's Hamlin, made for a successful debut season for the new engine partnership. In 2013, JGR signed veteran driver Matt Kenseth away from Roush Fenway Racing and Ford to drive the iconic No. 20 car in what would prove to be a wildly successful pairing. Kenseth, in his debut season with Toyota, won a series high 7 races in 2013 and challenged for the championship deep into the chase before eventually falling short to Jimmie Johnson. 2013 would prove to be Toyota's best in NASCAR, collecting 14 victories and challenging Chevrolet's stranglehold on the manufacturer's championship. After the success of 2013, the 2014 campaign would prove to be a monumental struggle for Toyota. After suffering a series of engine reliability problems, Toyota was forced to back down the performance of their TRD engines in the interest of preservation. The reliability problems disappeared, but as a result of the changes Toyota drivers found themselves at a significant horsepower deficit to their Chevrolet and Ford rivals. Busch would win at Auto Club Speedway in March and Hamlin would add a restrictor plate win in April at Talladega Superspeedway which would prove to be Toyota's final victory of the season. Toyota would not win again for almost a year, until Hamlin's win at Martinsville Speedway in the 6th race of the 2015 season would end the drought. Busch, who missed the first 11 races of the season with a broken leg, would win Toyota its first driver's championship that year.

In 2015, Furniture Row Racing switched from Chevrolet to Toyota and allied with JGR. Two years later, the team's Martin Truex Jr. won the manufacturer a second driver's title as he led a 1–2 Toyota championship finish with Busch. FRR ceased operations after the 2018 season, and Leavine Family Racing made their own move to Toyota for 2019. That year, Busch won his second championship. LFR folded after the 2020 season and its Toyota alliance was replaced by the newly-formed 23XI Racing.

Formula One

In 2002 Toyota started racing in Formula One with Toyota Motorsport GmbH, based in Cologne, Germany. Although the team scored a point in their first race in Australia, the first two seasons delivered multiple retirements and poor finishes. In 2004, designer Mike Gascoyne was hired to improve results, following previous experience at Jordan and Renault.

However, due to a "fundamental difference of opinion with regard to the technical operations", he was released from his contract in April in the 2006 season. Replaced by Pascal Vasselon, the teams competitiveness fell, and Toyota did not achieve another podium position until 2008. Toyota began supplying customer engines in 2005, initially with Jordan Grand Prix, and continuing as the team was brought and renamed as Midland F1 and Spyker respectively. In 2007, Toyota began supplying engines to the Williams F1 team, in return for providing a drive for Kazuki Nakajima.

With the rule changes in the 2009 Formula One season, the sport's previous winning teams, Ferrari, McLaren, and Renault, had a poor start to the season, and Toyota joined Brawn GP with the "double diffuser" design, making the TF109 one of the fastest cars in the opening races. A late season improvement in form managed two second places, including Toyota's home race in Japan, and secured fifth position.

Despite the recent improvement in results, Toyota announced on 4 November 2009 its withdrawal from Formula One. Akio Toyoda announced that Toyota would be stopping both the team and the engine deal with Williams, citing the economic environment as the main deciding factor. Despite having one of the sports largest budgets, Toyota did not manage to win a Formula One race.

Deutsche Rennsport Meisterschaft

IMSA GT

In the 1980s, Toyota participated in the IMSA GT Championship, using a Toyota Celica in the GTU class. Later Toyota partnered with All American Racers team and moved to the GTP class with sports prototypes such as the Toyota Eagle HF89 and Toyota Eagle Mark III, winning the 1992 and 1993 Drivers and Manufacturers titles from the hand of the Argentinean pilot Juan Manuel Fangio II. Toyota and Lexus powered prototypes had also taken top honors in Grand-Am Rolex Sports Car Series and 24 Hours of Daytona race.

Argentina

Toyota Gazoo Racing Argentina, formerly Toyota Team Argentina, is owned by Toyota's national subsidiary. They compete in Súper TC 2000, Top Race V6 and Turismo Nacional championships. Their most successful stint is in the Super TC 2000 (previously TC 2000), where they have won three drivers' championships: Norberto Fontana in 2002 and Matías Rossi in 2011 and 2013.

TGR-DC Racing School

Current drivers

Records and statistics

Prominent rally victories

See also
Toyota Motorsport GmbH
Toyota Racing Development
Lexus#Motorsport

References

Websites

Citations

External links

 
Japanese auto racing teams
Japanese racecar constructors